Ahiran is a village in the Suti I CD block in the Jangipur subdivision of Murshidabad district in  the state of West Bengal, India. It serves as the Headquarters of the Suti I administrative division.

History
This is a historical village of Murshidabad district. The word Ahiran means "an area of Ahirs". The gold coins belonging to Gupta period were found at Ahiran during road construction on National Highway 34 (India).

Geography

Location
The village is situated on the bank of Bansloi River.

Area overview
Jangipur subdivision is crowded with 52 census towns and as such it had to be presented in two location maps. One of the maps can be seen alongside. The subdivision is located in the Rarh region that is spread over from adjoining Santhal Pargana division of Jharkhand. The land is slightly higher in altitude than the surrounding plains and is gently undulating. The river Ganges, along with its distributaries, is prominent in both the maps. At the head of the subdivision is the 2,245 m long Farakka Barrage, one of the largest projects of its kind in the country. Murshidabad district shares with Bangladesh a porous international border which is notoriously crime prone (partly shown in this map). The subdivision has two large power plants - the 2,100 MW Farakka Super Thermal Power Station and the 1,600 MW Sagardighi Thermal Power Station. According to a 2016 report, there are around 1,000,000 (1 million/ ten lakh) workers engaged in the beedi industry in Jangipur subdivision. 90% are home-based and 70% of the home-based workers are women. As of 2013, an estimated 2.4 million people reside along the banks of the Ganges alone in Murshidabad district. Severe erosion occurs along the banks.

Note: The two maps present some of the notable locations in the subdivision. All places marked in the maps are linked in the larger full screen maps.

Demographics
The population of Ahiran village, as per the 2011 Census by the Government of India, was 17,079 with 8,691 males and 8,388 females.

Civic administration

CD block HQ
The headquarters of Suti I CD block are located at Ahiran.

Offices
Some of the government offices located in this area are:
Suti I (community development block)
 B.D.O Office
 Sub Inspector Of Schools 
 [Integrated Child Development Services] (ICDS)
 Suti I Block Youth Office
 B.L and L.R.O,
 Ahiran Hospital, Ahiran 
 Post Office,
 Bangiya Gramin Vikash Bank,
 Bank of India,
 Office of the Assistant Director of Agriculture
 Ahrion electric bill collection office and mini electronic supply centers were established at Suti 1 block (WBSEDCL - AHIRAN CCC).

Transport
 Ahiran is connected through NH 34 and Ahiran railway station is situated in Barharwa–Azimganj–Katwa loop line of  Indian Railway.
 Ahiran Halt Bus Stop and 
 Ahiran Haat Bus Stop.

Education
The few famous schools situated in the village include the Ahiran Hemangini Vidyaytan School (H.S.),Ahiran Schinananda Girl High School and Bangabari High School.
  Ahiran Model School, Suti - I block.                
  Aligarh Muslim University Center    Murshidabad .
 CWSN Resource Room, a school for child with special needs also here.

Healthcare
 Ahiran Hospital is the Primary Health Center, the B.M.O.H. Ahiran BPHC Suti-1, Murshidabad, near Jangipur Sub-Divisional Hospital.
 Veterinary Dispensaries/ Hospital -BLDO Suti-1 Block Animal Primary Health center at Ahiran.

References

External links
 

Villages in Murshidabad district